Stig Jørgensen is a former Danish professional darts player.

Darts career
Jørgensen has been picked 26 times for the Danish national team, which is an all-time record. Among other tournaments, Jørgensen has played 6 WDF World Cups and 5 WDF Europe Cups.

He was part of the Danish team which won the team and overall events at the 2008 WDF Europe Cup.

External links
 Stig Jørgensen stats at the Darts Database

Danish darts players
Living people
1967 births
British Darts Organisation players